Reggina 1914 S.r.l., commonly referred to as Reggina, is an Italian football club based in Reggio Calabria. Founded in 1914, they currently play in Serie B, and play their home matches at the 27,763 seater Stadio Oreste Granillo.

They are nicknamed the amaranto (amaranth) after their official dark red colours. The club was formerly known as Reggina Calcio before declaring bankruptcy in 2015, as well as A.S.D. Reggio Calabria in 2015–16 season and Urbs Reggina 1914 from 2016 to 2019.

In its previous guise Reggina played in the Serie A for nine seasons between 1999 and 2009, including a seven-year consecutive spell starting in 2002. During these years, the club narrowly avoided relegation in most seasons and never finished in the top half. After failing to make a return in the first few years the club fell into financial and sporting difficulties, culminating in falling into the lower tiers of Italian football before returning to the Serie B in 2020.

Names
The club was founded on 11 January 1914 as Unione Sportiva Reggio Calabria, and changed name many times (Società Calcistica Reggio, Reggio Foot Ball Club, Associazione Sportiva Reggina, Società Sportiva La Dominante), finally assuming the denomination Reggina Calcio in 1986.

After 2015 bankruptcy, the club had used A.S.D. Reggio Calabria as the new name of the new legal person, and then the club changed to the denomination Urbs Reggina 1914 S.r.l. in 2016. Since 2019, Reggina 1914 S.r.l..

History

The club was founded on 11 January 1914.

Serie A (1999–2009)
In the late 1990s to 2000s, Reggina have been alternating between the top two levels of the Italian league system. They reached the Italian top division Serie A for the first time in 1999. Two years later, they lost a relegation playout to Verona, being consequently relegated to 2001–02 Serie B. Reggina finished third in Serie B in 2002, earning a return to Serie A. In 2003, Reggina survived a relegation playout against Atalanta. They would spend the next 7 years maintaining their Serie A status until their eventual relegation in the 2008–09 season.

In August 2006, they were indicted as part of the second wave of Calciopoli investigations. Originally punished with a 15-point deduction for the 2006–07 Serie A, then reduced to 11 points following appeal. Despite the heavy deduction of points, Reggina managed to save themselves from relegation, defeating newly crowned UEFA Champions League winners Milan on the final matchday and ending the season with 40 points (including the deduction), just one single point above the third relegation spot, occupied by Chievo. They poorly started the Serie A 2007-08, causing head coach Massimo Ficcadenti to be sacked and replaced by Renzo Ulivieri. A third managerial change, with Ulivieri fired and replacing with team scout Nevio Orlandi, proved to be successful as Reggina improved their results and performances, escaping relegation with key wins at Catania, and home to Empoli. Orlandi was subsequently confirmed at the helm of the amaranto for the Serie A 2008–09.

Serie B (2009–2014)
Since their relegation in 2008–09 season, Reggina has become slightly inconsistent in their attempts to return to Italy's top flight. The 2009–10 season would see three coaches at the helm; Walter Novellino, Ivo Iaconi, Roberto Breda. Despite possessing Bonazzoli, Carmona, Tedesco, Brienza and home grown star Missiroli they were unable to gain a better position than 13th. Disappointing for a team just relegated from the top division. Top goal scorer for the campaign was Brienza with 12.

The 2010–11 season was regarded as one of the Amaranto's best in Serie B. Shockingly they would conduct their usual coaching merry go round, as Gianluca Atzori would lead them to a 6th-place finish and playoffs to Serie A. they would stumble at the last hurdle losing to Novara in a two legged play off. Top players include; Acerbi, Missiroli, Tedesco, Brienza, Bonazzoli (C) and Milan Loanee Adiyiah. Top goal scorer: Bonazzoli with 19 goals

The 2011–12 season was another disappointing season from the Amaranto, with a 12th-placed finish. Two coaches took charge of Reggina this season; Roberto Breda initially, before being sacked and replaced by Angelo Gregucci, only to be replaced by Breda again towards the end of the season. Unlike the previous season they did not make the play-offs. Top players in this season's squad include: Adejo, Emerson, (Ramos Borges Emerson), Missiroli, Bonazzoli (C), and Ceravolo.  Top scorer was Ceravolo with 11.

The 2012–13 season would be marred with yet another controversy similar to that of 2006.  Reggina were penalised for the latest match fixing scandal that hit Italian shores and were given a −4 penalty as a result. After appeal it was reduced to −2 instead. They were in contention for playoff places right until the last few rounds where poor form saw them end the season in 11th place.

The 2013–14 season ended in disaster, as Reggina won just six out of 42 games and finished second bottom, resulting in relegation to Lega Pro. The season also marked Foti's retirement from his role as president, who was handed over to Giuseppe Ranieri.

Lega Pro

For the club's 2014–15 Lega Pro campaign, Reggina began the season with former captain Francesco Cozza as head coach. After a difficult start to the season and two coaching changes, youth team coach and former player Giacomo Tedesco was hired as head coach for the final three weeks of the season. Despite winning two of the final three matches, Reggina finished last in the league and would have to rely on an appeal of their point penalty to lift them out of the relegation zone. The appeal was successful and 2 points were returned to move them out of last place. Tedesco guided the team to survival in the playout over rivals Messina.

Serie D one-year stint

Despite avoiding relegation in the 2014–15 season, Reggina failed to meet the deadline to register for Lega Pro and the club declared bankruptcy. A new legal person of the club, "A.S.D. Reggio Calabria", was formed to play in Serie D for the 2015–16 season, Reggio Calabria ended the season in 4th place, losing in the first round of playoffs against Cavese. During the season the club also re-incorporated from associazione sportiva dilettantistica to società sportiva dilettantistica a responsabilità limitata legal form.

Reggio Calabria was owned by Mimmo Praticò, former regional president of CONI.

Back to Serie C

In June 2016, it was reported that the club was renamed from "S.S.D. Reggio Calabria a r.l." to "S.S.D. Urbs Sportiva Reggina 1914 a r.l.". The club was then renamed as Urbs Reggina 1914 S.r.l.

Despite finishing as the losing side of the first round of the promotion playoffs of 2015–16 Serie D, the club filed for Lega Pro (later renamed Serie C) repechage to fill one of the vacancies for the 2016–17 season and was successfully admitted. Reggina ended the season in 13th place.

In January 2019, facing a crisis with a potential player strike due to non-payment of salaries, the club was sold to Italian entrepreneur Luca Gallo.

On 1 July 2019, the club announced to change the name to "Reggina 1914 S.r.l.".

Serie B return
Reggina won its Serie C group in 2020, earning a promotion back to the Serie B for the upcoming season. The team upon its Serie B return included experienced players from higher levels including Jérémy Ménez and Germán Denis.

Rivalries
Reggina are fierce rivals with neighbours Messina, who are just a twenty-minute ferry ride apart from each other. Twice every season they clash in the Derby dello Stretto (Strait of Messina Derby). In the 2014–15 season, Reggina defeated Messina in both legs of the playout to send Messina down to Serie D. There is also a major Calabrian derby between Reggina and Crotone, but both teams have not played in the same league in over five years. Reggina also has a derby with fellow Calabrian team Catanzaro, which is currently down in Serie C.

Colours and badges

Reggina used a logo with a letter R and a football on it. Some variant of the logo, had 1986, the year of foundation of Reggina Calcio on it. Due to 2015 bankruptcy, the new owner introduced a new logo as the old design was tied to the old legal person of the club. Due to 2016 renaming, some modification was introduced, which a letter R was re-introduced in the logo. However, the design of the ball on the 2016 logo was different from the historical logo, which the 2016 logo used a leather ball. In 2019, the club reverted to use the historical design of the logo.

Players

Current squad

Other players under contract

On loan

Notable players

Club staff

Managerial history

Reggina have had many managers and trainers throughout the history of the club, in some seasons more than one manager was in charge. Here is the chronological list of them from 1928.

Kit manufacturer & sponsors

Kit manufacturer

Sponsors

References

External links

 
Football clubs in Calabria
Association football clubs established in 1914
Serie A clubs
Serie B clubs
Serie C clubs
S.S.D. Reggio Calabria
Phoenix clubs (association football)